Conejo may refer to:

Conejo, California, an unincorporated community
Conejo, New Mexico, a census-designated place
Conejo Valley, a region in Southern California
Conejo Island, Honduras, in the Gulf of Fonseca

See also 
 Conejos (disambiguation)
 Conejo, a Spanish surname